Charles Pepper (6 June 1875 – 13 September 1917) was an English first-class cricketer active 1900–01 who played for Nottinghamshire. He was born in Youghal, County Cork; died in La Clytte, Belgium when serving in World War I.

References

1875 births
1917 deaths
English cricketers
Nottinghamshire cricketers
British military personnel killed in World War I
Bedfordshire cricketers